The Colgate Raiders men's ice hockey team is a National Collegiate Athletic Association (NCAA) Division I college ice hockey program that represents Colgate University. The Raiders are a member of ECAC Hockey. They used to play at Starr Rink from its inauguration in 1959 until the 2015–16 season. Starting with the 2016–17 NCAA season, the Raiders have started playing their home games in the Class of 1965 Arena. The program is located in Hamilton, New York.

History

Early years
Colgate's ice hockey team began as a four-game experiment in 1916 and 1917. The program was put on ice during World War I but returned in 1920 with a coach leading the Red Raiders. James Ballantine stayed with Colgate for eight years despite the program being mothballed in 1923 and remaining fallow until 1928. After ensuring the team returned he handed the coaching duties over to Ray Watkins who stayed for four uneventful seasons before assistant professor of Physical Education John Howard Starr took over. Starr spent the first four seasons toiling with losing records before both he and the team started to turn the Red Raiders' fortunes. In the late 1930s Colgate started posting lofty records of 8–1 and 9–4 and continued doing so into the early-40s. In 1942 Starr left the program to volunteer for service in World War II. The team continued on for two seasons, posting an undefeated record in 1943 of 11–0, before being suspended for the final year of the war. Once peace had been achieved Starr and the team returned. After a down season in 1946 the Red Raiders earned their second undefeated record, going 14–0 in 1946–47. The team kept up its winning ways until 1950 when Starr resigned as head coach. The new bench boss, Tom Dockrell got off to a slow start with the Red Raiders who became a founding member of the first ice hockey conference, the Tri-State League, but didn't get an opportunity to improve his record due to unseasonably warm weather that caused the program to cease operations for the next six years.

Indoor ice and the ECAC
Colgate finally returned to the ice in 1958 and continued with new head coach Olav Kollevoll for two seasons before their first indoor ice rink was finished. The building was dedicated to the former coach as the J. Howard Starr Rink at the first game played on its surface in December 1959. With the stability of the program ensured the team was able to build itself into a respectable unit, producing increasing win totals into the early 1960s and founding its second conference, ECAC Hockey along with 27 other schools. Colgate finished their first year of conference play with an 18–6 mark, setting a new school record for wins and finishing tied for 6th but it wasn't enough to earn them a selection as one of the top 8 teams in the conference so they missed the playoffs. The following year saw the team slip to 7th in the ECAC but this time they received an entry into the postseason, losing to eventual champion Harvard in the quarterfinals. The next year brought the team record up to 19 wins and a second playoff berth where they once again lost to the eventual ECAC champion in their first game, this time to Providence. After a down year in 1965 Kollevoll was replaced by Ron Ryan who held the reins for seven seasons but could only lead the team to middling results most years. After two poor showings in the early '70s the team passed through three coaches over five years, eventually landing with former St. Lawrence player Terry Slater.

Rise to prominence and tragedy
Slater's first season was an unmitigated disaster, with the team posting its worst record since tournament play began (as of 2018) but that was wiped away in his second season when the Red Raiders posted their first winning season since 1970. The following season brought Colgate its first ECAC playoff in over a decade and in 1981 Colgate notched its first 20+ win season, its first ECAC playoff win and its first appearance in the NCAA tournament. Slater would keep Colgate in good standing for the duration of the 1980s, posing winning records in all but one season, however, the Red Raiders couldn't get out of the ECAC quarterfinals in any of their succeeding appearances. All of that changed in 1989–90 when Colgate jumped out with a tremendous start and never looked back. The team won its first ECAC regular season championship by a huge margin and swept its way through the ECAC tournament to take its first conference title. The Red Raiders received the second eastern seed and a bye into the Quarterfinals where they defeated Lake Superior State in two close games. After downing Boston University in the semifinal Colgate only had Wisconsin left in they way but were unable to overcome the Badgers and had to settle for Runner-Up. Colgate predictably declined from its team-record 31 wins the next season but still posted a decent record. In December 1991 Terry Slater suffered a severe stroke and was hospitalized, dying four days later at the age of 54. His death gutted the team, but they still managed a respectable year in his absence.

Continued success
Don Vaughan arrived in 1992 to help heal the program and while the team struggled through sub-par seasons early on there were some encouraging signs with scattered postseason wins. By the mid-1990s the Red Raiders were posing winning records once more and by the end of the millennium Colgate found itself back in the NCAA tournament. Vaughan was so respected by the administration that he was tasked with serving as the interim Athletic Director for the 2003–04 school year, allowing his assistant Stan Moore to lead the team to an ECAC title and earn an ECAC Coach of the Year Award in the process. Not to be outdone, Vaughan returned to the bench the next year and got a second trip to the NCAA tournament followed by his own ECAC title the season after. Vaughan continues to coach the Raiders and now in his 26th season he holds the school record for wins, losses and ties while having produced several NHL players along with many more professional alumni across Europe and North America.

Current roster
As of August 26, 2022.

Season-by-season results

Source:

Coaching history
As of the completion of 2021–22 season

† Terry Slater Died on December 6, 1991.

Awards and honors

NCAA

Individual
Spencer Penrose Award
Terry Slater: 1990

All-Americans
AHCA First Team All-Americans

1969–70: Tommy Earl, F
1981–82: Chris Renaud, D
1983–84: Steve Smith, F
1987–88: Réjean Boivin, F
1989–90: Dave Gagnon, G
1999–00: Andy McDonald, F
2008–09: David McIntyre, F
2011–12: Austin Smith, F

AHCA Second Team All-Americans

1984–85: Jeff Cooper, G
1989–90: Joel Gardner, F
1991–92: Dale Band, F
1995–96: Brad Dexter, D
1996–97: Mike Harder, F
2017–18: Colton Point, G

ECAC Hockey

Individual

Player of the Year
Dave Gagnon, G: 1989–90
Andy McDonald, C: 1999–00
Austin Smith, RW: 2011–12

Tim Taylor Award
Terry Slater: 1989–90
Don Vaughan: 1999–00, 2013–14
Stan Moore: 2003–04

Best Defensive Forward
Jon Smyth: 2003–04

Best Defensive Defenseman
Pierson Brandon: 2020–21

Ken Dryden Award
Mark DeKanich: 2005–06

Student-Athlete of the Year
Matt Verboon: 2022–23

Tournament MOP
Craig Woodcroft: 1990
Carter Gylander: 2023

All-Conference
First Team All-ECAC Hockey

1969–70: Tommy Earl, F
1981–82: Chris Renaud, D
1983–84: Steve Smith, F
1984–85: Jeff Cooper, G
1987–88: Réjean Boivin, F
1988–89: Scott Young, D
1989–90: Dave Gagnon, G; Joel Gardner, F
1991–92: Dale Band, F
1995–96: Brad Dexter, D
1996–97: Mike Harder, F
1999–00: Cory Murphy, D; Andy McDonald, F
2003–04: Jon Smyth, F
2005–06: Mark Dekanich, G; Tyler Burton, F
2008–09: David McIntyre, F
2011–12: Austin Smith, F
2020–21: Josh McKechney, F
2022–23: Alex Young, F

Second Team All-ECAC Hockey

1962–63: Steve Riggs, F
1963–64: Steve Riggs, F
1980–81: Chris Renaud, D; Dan Fridgen, F
1985–86: Gerard Waslen, F
1986–87: Wayne Crowley, G
1988–89: Paul Cohen, G
1993–94: Bruce Gardiner, F
1994–95: Brad Dexter, D; Mike Harder, F
1995–96: Dan Brenzavich, G; Mike Harder, F; Chris DeProfio, F
1998–99: Andy McDonald, D
2000–01: Cory Murphy, D; Sean Nolan, F
2002–03: Scooter Smith, G
2003–04: Rob Brown, D
2005–06: Kyle Wilson, F
2006–07: Mark Dekanich, G; Tyler Burton, F; Jesse Winchester, F
2007–08: Tyler Burton, F
2009–10: David McIntyre, F
2011–12: Chris Wagner, F
2017–18: Colton Point, G

Third Team All-ECAC Hockey

2007–08: Mark Dekanich, G; Jesse Winchester, F
2011–12: Thomas Larkin, D
2013–14: Charlie Finn, G; Spiro Goulakos, D
2014–15: Tyson Spink, F; Kyle Baun, F
2015–16: Tyson Spink, F
2016–17: Jake Kulevich, D
2018–19: Bobby McMann, F

ECAC Hockey All-Rookie Team

1987–88: Steve Poapst, D
1988–89: Dale Band, F; Jamie Cooke, F
1989–90: Bob Haddock, D
1991–92: Brad Dexter, D; Ron Fogarty, F
1993–94: Mike Harder, F
1994–95: Dan Brenzavich, G; Tim Loftsgard, F
1997–98: Cory Murphy, D
2000–01: Rob Brown, D
2003–04: Mike Campaner, D
2004–05: Tyler Burton, F
2005–06: Nick St. Pierre, D
2012–13: Kyle Baun, F; Tylor Spink, F
2013–14: Charlie Finn, G
2017–18: Nick Austin, D
2020–21: Pierson Brandon, D; Alex Young, F

Statistical leaders
Source:

Career points leaders

Career goaltending leaders

GP = Games played; Min = Minutes played; GA = Goals against; SO = Shutouts; SV% = Save percentage; GAA = Goals against average

Minimum 30 games

Statistics current through the start of the 2022-23 season.

Olympians
This is a list of Colgate alumni were a part of an Olympic team.

Players

Raiders in the NHL
As of July 1, 2022.

WHA
Two players were members of WHA teams.

See also
Colgate Raiders women's ice hockey
Colgate Raiders

References

External links
 

 
Ice hockey teams in New York (state)